The Battle of Pilsud was fought between Sawai Jai Singh and the Marathas under Kanhoji Bhonsle and Khanderao Dabhade.

Background
There were many troubles for Jai Singh II when he was the governor of Malwa, in order to deal with the turbulent bands of marauders, Jai Singh had maintained an army of 10,000 soldiers, which included the clansmen of Budh Singh Hada and Chatrasal Bundela. The army was well equipped and included a contingent of musketeers and artillery. Jai Singh had a good start in his governorship as there were no Maratha raids during the winters. Jai Singh took advantage of this and wiped out the local rebels and raiders. On 13 August 1714 the Emperor sent Jai Singh a Robe of Honour and said "you have not left any trace of the robbers; travellers can now pass in peace". Jai Singh also repelled the Afghan chieftain called Inayat, who was raiding Ujjain. On 25 March 1714 Jai Singh defeated Dilir Khan at Kashigaon and on 14 April he defeated Mohan Singh Umat and the Rohilla mercenaries. In 1715 Jai Singh expelled the Maratha raider called Ganga and then marched towards Sironj, where he defeated the Afghans. The Afghans under Dilir Khan called the Marathas for help against Jai Singh II. The Jaipur raja upon getting to know about the large host of Marathas that were approaching, quickly attacked Dilir. On 2 April, he attacked the Afghan army of 12,000 men and defeated them. 2000 Afghans were killed in battle while the Jaipur army lost 500 men. Jai Singh then turned towards the Afghan camp in Bhilsa and devastated it.

Battle
It was at this time that reports started coming about two large Maratha armies that had entered Malwa. Kanhoji Bhonsle and Khande Rao Dabhade with an army of 42,000 men had crossed the Narmada river on 1–2 April and had made their camps at Tilwara. they pillaged within 4 miles of the provincial capital and looted and burnt the city of Depalpur. On 5 April the Marathas sent an army of 12,000 horsemen to Barwah and they marched around Indore and demanded chauth from the province of Kampel. Upon knowing of these developments, Jai Singh quickly marched towards Ujjain and sent his deputy to secure his capital. On 8 May, the Jaipur Raja moved towards the Marathas, while the Maratha commanders, Kanho and Ganga were deciding how to cross Narmada with all the loot they had collected. Jai Singh force marched towards them crossing 38 miles and arrived before the Maratha camp on 10 May. The Marathas upon seeing the small Jaipur army became confident upon their numbers and advanced to fight them. The travel-worn Rajputs also advanced, Budh Singh Hada, Chatrasal Bundela, Dhiraj Singh Khichi and several minor Jagirdars were under the command of Jai Singh II. After a fight of four hours, the Marathas broke and started fleeing. The Marathas fled six-miles away from the field of battle into the mountains of Pilsud and were confidently marching in the mountainous region, thinking that they had escaped. However Jai Singh chased them the whole night and caught up to them on 11 May. Upon seeing the Jaipur army, the Marathas fled to the Narmada river and left all of their loot.

Aftermath
The Maratha army were forced to leave two months worth of loot, that they had acquired from Malwa and Khandesh. Jai allowed his men to keep the spoils of war. "everyone gained booty enough to feed him for years". The emperor praised Jai Singh for his achievement and the local jagirdars confessed that no imperial officer had inflicted such a great victory in Malwa against the Marathas.

References

Pilsud
Pilsud
1715 in India
Pilsud
History of Rajasthan